Edgar Bolaños (born 20 February 1951) is a Guatemalan former footballer. He competed in the men's tournament at the 1976 Summer Olympics.

References

External links
 
 

1951 births
Living people
Guatemalan footballers
Guatemala international footballers
Olympic footballers of Guatemala
Footballers at the 1976 Summer Olympics
Comunicaciones F.C. players
Place of birth missing (living people)
Association football midfielders